Pulhal aeri, or Pulhal lake, sometimes spelled Puzhal lake, also known as the Red Hills Lake, is located in Red Hills, Chennai, India. It lies in Thiruvallur district of Tamil Nadu state. It is one of the two rain-fed reservoirs from where water is drawn for supply to Chennai City, the other one being the Chembarambakkam Lake and Porur Lake.

The full capacity of the lake is 3,300 million ft³ (93 million m³).

History

The Pulhal reservoir was built in 1876 during the British rule in Pulhal, Chennai, The reservoir was originally a small tank with a capacity of 500 million cubic feet (mcft) and two masonry weirs, built using locally available laterite stones, then functioned as surplus weirs to release excess water from the water body. Today, these masonry weirs are water-retaining structures as they have been replaced by two shutters. In 1997, the storage capacity of the water reservoir was increased to 3,300 mcft and the depth to 21.20 ft to cater to the drinking water needs of Chennai and also to store Krishna river water received from Andhra Pradesh through Poondi Reservoir and the Sholavaram Tank. Until 2012, the Water Resources Department (WRD) has only taken up maintenance work worth of  500,000 every year.

Geography
There are two masonry weirs in the reservoir. One weir is 178 m long and the other is 220 m long and 15 ft deep. The bund measures 5 m and runs to a distance of 7 km. The weirs have turned porous over the years. The south west part of the reservoir has Ambattur residential locality and has the main road to reach Avadi junction. Water treatment plant and Pulhal Central prison is located in the east part of the reservoir and has the highway road to reach CMBT and North Chennai. The North part has Padiyanallur village Thiruvallur koot road en route to reach Thiruvallur. There are two ways reservoir's bund road routes are located north east part of the reservoir, one bund route is from Alamaram junction to Redhills market junction and the other one bund road is from Redhills bypass road junction to Surapet junction. The North west part has Pammathukulam, Pothur, Attanthangal and Naravarikuppam villages.

Jones Tower 

Jones Tower was built in 1881 in Pulhal lake. It is used to measure the depth of the lake water level. The surrounding bund roads are used by many for  exercises such as walking, running. High level Electric motors are used to inlet the water from the lake to the tank before the cleaning process. There are 11 Electric motor pumps located play an important role when the dry season is available for providing drinking water to the Chennai city.

Water Seepage 
During the heavy rainfall in November/December 2015 water seepage occurred on 19 November 2015 on the two places of Pulhal lake near the weirs due to heavy storage in the water reservoir .

Upgradation

2012 : Repairing process 

In June 2012, the WRD called for a tender for strengthening the reservoir at a cost of  101.6 million. Besides small repair to the shutters, filter arrangements on the slope of the bund will be made for 2 km. The road on top of the bund will also be widened by 1 m. The water level of the reservoir has been brought down to 10.46 ft to take up the project. The water body receives 300 cubic feet per second (cusecs) from Poondi canal to supply to the city.

2015 : Heavy Rainfall  November/December 

According to Chennai metropolitan water supply and sewage board on 14 November 2015 rainfall in Pulhal reservoir has a storage of 2,228 million cubic feet as against its total capacity of 3,300 mcft and receiving an inflow of 1,196 cubic feet per second. Pulhal has lowest storage among the four reservoirs with 67.5 per cent of its capacity. On 1 December 2015 Pulhal also recorded 320mm, the highest volume of rainfall flowing overnight rain in the history. Discharge from the lake and maintain the water level two feet below the full level of 21.2 feet. Sand bags have also been placed in vulnerable areas along the surplus course such as Thandalkazhani, Vadakarai and Thiruneelakandan Nagar and Baba Nagar in Pulhal. People have also been warned of inundation. The surplus course of Red Hills travels for 15 km before joining the sea near Ennore creek. On 2 December 2015 Pulhal lake has recorded water inflow of 9607(cusecs) and outflow of 5470(cusecs), Which was the highest inflow and outflow of reservoir's history.

Gallery

See also 
 Chembarambakkam Lake
 Sholavaram tank
 Poondi Reservoir
 Water management in Chennai

References 

Lakes of Chennai
Reservoirs in Tamil Nadu